William Wilbur Wirtz (June 25, 1887 – June 14, 1965) was a professor of foreign languages who also served as athletic director at Northern Illinois University. He was the head football coach at NIU from 1910 to 1916, compiling a record of 33–17–9.  Wirtz was also the head basketball coach at Northern Illinois from 1910 to 1918 and the head baseball coach at the school from 1912 to 1917. 

Wirtz grew up in Sandwich, Illinois and began his teaching career at age 19. He joined the faculty of Northern Illinois University in the early days of the school, then known as Northern Illinois State Normal School. He was on NIU's governing board from 1949 to 1953, serving as chairman for the last two years. He also served on the Illinois Teachers College Board.

Wirtz Hall on the NIU campus was named after him. The building was the original home of the NIU College of Business. Groundbreaking for Wirtz Hall took place in 1962, and the dedication ceremony was held in 1965 five months after Wirtz's death.  

Wirtz married Alfa Belle White and had three daughters, Marion, Frances and Kathryn, and two sons, Robert and William Willard. His son W. Willard Wirtz went on to serve as the Secretary of Labor between 1962 and 1969 under John F. Kennedy and Lyndon B. Johnson. He died on June 14, 1965 at the age of 77.

Head coaching record

Football

References

External links
 

1887 births
1965 deaths
Northern Illinois University faculty
Northern Illinois Huskies baseball coaches
Northern Illinois Huskies football coaches
Northern Illinois Huskies men's basketball coaches
People from Sandwich, Illinois
Basketball coaches from Illinois
Sportspeople from the Chicago metropolitan area